Bryconexodon trombetasi is a species of characins endemic to Brazil. 
It is found in the Trombetas River basin in Brazil.

References

Characidae
Fish of Brazil
Endemic fauna of Brazil
Taxa named by Geraldo Mendes dos Santos
Taxa named by Michel Louis Arthur Marie Ange François Jégu
Taxa named by Efrem Jorge Gondim Ferreira
Fish described in 1991